Python-based Simulations of Chemistry Framework (PySCF) is an ab initio computational chemistry program natively implemented in Python program language.  The package aims to provide a simple, light-weight and efficient platform for quantum chemistry code developing and calculation.  It provides various functions to do the Hartree–Fock, MP2, density functional theory, MCSCF, coupled cluster theory at non-relativistic level and 4-component relativistic Hartree–Fock theory.  Although most functions are written in Python, the computation critical modules are intensively optimized in C.  As a result, the package works as efficient as other C/Fortran-based quantum chemistry program. PySCF is developed by Qiming Sun. PySCF2.0 is the latest version of the program.

See also 
 Quantum chemistry software

References

External links 
 PySCF source code
 PySCF HomePage

Computational chemistry software